The Gatehouse at Colestown Cemetery is located at the intersection of Kings Highway and Church Road in the township of Cherry Hill in Camden County, New Jersey, United States. The gatehouse was built in 1858 for the Colestown Cemetery. It was added to the National Register of Historic Places on May 21, 1975, for its significance in social history.

See also
 National Register of Historic Places listings in Camden County, New Jersey

References

External links
 

Cherry Hill, New Jersey
Buildings and structures in Camden County, New Jersey
National Register of Historic Places in Camden County, New Jersey
New Jersey Register of Historic Places
Gatehouses (architecture)
Cemeteries in Camden County, New Jersey